The Alexandria Blue Anchors (formerly known as the Alexandria Beetles) were a baseball team that played in the Northwoods League, an NCAA-sanctioned collegiate summer baseball league. The team played at Knute Nelson Memorial Park in Alexandria, Minnesota. The team was renamed in March 2013 in conjunction with the sale of the team to a new local ownership group.

History
The Alexandria Blue Anchors were founded as the Alexandria Beetles in 2001. In 2013 it was sold to Shane Schmidt, Shaynen Schmidt, Scott Allen, and Adam Barta and renamed the Alexandria Blue Anchors. The new owners failed to make the team financially viable, and it was last in attendance in the Northwoods League for the entire time it was the Blue Anchors. The team folded shortly after the 2015 season.

Since 2016 one night a season, you can still see the Beetles play in the ballpark as the Willmar Stingers become the Alexandria Beetles for a night. It pays homage to a time that once was when Alexandria had their own team. Over the past four seasons, the Willmar Stingers have played as the Beetles they have a 4-1 record. In 2019, the Beetles won a game against the La Crosse Loggers 14-4. On this night over 1,300 people from the community showed up to see their team play with the hope that someday a Northwoods League team will return to Alexandria. In July 2020, the Beetles returned to action in an exhibition game against the Willmar Stingers in a game the Beetles won 9-8. The Beetles have returned to action in 2021.

References

External links 
 Alexandria Blue Anchors - official site
 Northwoods League - official site

Northwoods League teams

Amateur baseball teams in Minnesota
2001 establishments in Minnesota
2015 disestablishments in Minnesota
Baseball teams established in 2001
Baseball teams disestablished in 2015
Douglas County, Minnesota
Defunct baseball teams in Minnesota